is a Japanese footballer currently playing as a goalkeeper for Kashiwa Reysol of J1 League.

Career statistics

Club
.

Notes

References

External links

2002 births
Living people
Association football people from Chiba Prefecture
Japanese footballers
Japan youth international footballers
Association football goalkeepers
Kashiwa Reysol players